Gisle is a given name. Notable people with the given name include:

Gisle Ellingsen (born 1965), Norwegian high jumper
Gisle Elvebakken (born 1970), Norwegian speed skater
Gisle Fenne (born 1963), Norwegian biathlete
Gisle Johnson (1822–1894), Norwegian theologian and educator
Gisle Johnson (Scouting) (1934–2014), Norwegian chief scout
Gisle Hannemyr (born 1953), Norwegian computer scientist
Gisle Kverndokk (born 1967), Norwegian contemporary composer
Gisle Midttun (1881–1940), Norwegian cultural historian and museologist
Gisle Meininger Saudland (born 1986), Norwegian politician
Gisle Saga (born 1974), Norwegian music producer and songwriter
Gisle Straume (1917–1988), Norwegian actor and theatre director
Gisle Torvik (born 1975), Norwegian jazz musician